Alfaro is a surname. People with the surname include:

In the arts
Carlota Alfaro (born 1933), Puerto Rican fashion designer
Emilio Alfaro (1933–1998), Argentine actor and director
Hugo Alfaro (1917–1996), Uruguayan journalist
Luis Alfaro (born 1963), American performer and activist
Oscar Alfaro (1921–1963), Bolivian writer
Xiomara Alfaro (1930–2018), Cuban opera singer

In politics and government
Bernardo Soto Alfaro (1854–1931), President of Costa Rica
Eloy Alfaro (1842–1912), President of Ecuador
Enrique Alfaro Ramírez (1973), Mayor of Guadalajara, Mexico
Eric Alfaro (born 1982), Puerto Rican politician
Fernando Chamorro Alfaro (1824–1863), Nicaraguan general
Rufina Alfaro, Panamanian independence figure
Prudencio Alfaro(1861-1915)
Ricardo J. Alfaro (1882-1971)
Colon Eloy Alfaro  (son of Eloy Alfaro)

In sports

Given name A–F
Alejandro Alfaro (born 1986), Spanish footballer
Álvaro Misael Alfaro (born 1971), Salvadoran footballer
Boris Alfaro (born 1988), Panamanian footballer
Cristián Alfaro (born 1987), Argentine footballer
Emiliano Alfaro (born 1988), Uruguayan footballer
Enrique Alfaro Rojas (born 1974), Mexican footballer
Éver Alfaro (born 1982), Costa Rican footballer
Fabián Alfaro (born 1981), Chilean footballer
Fabricio Alfaro (born 1990), Salvadoran footballer
Flavio Alfaro, American Olympic baseball player
Francisco López Alfaro (born 1962), Spanish footballer and manager

Given name G–Z
Gustavo Alfaro (born 1962), Argentine footballer and manager
Jason Alfaro (born 1977), American baseball player
Jorge Alfaro (born 1993), American baseball player
José Alfaro (born 1983), Nicaraguan boxer
Manuel Alfaro (born 1971), Spanish footballer and manager
Mauricio Alfaro (born 1956), Salvadoran footballer and manager
Nathalia Alfaro (born 1987), Costa Rican beach volleyball player
Pablo Alfaro (born 1969), a Spanish footballer 
Rafael Alfaro, Salvadoran Olympic swimmer
Roque Alfaro (born 1956), Argentine footballer and manager
Sandro Alfaro (born 1971), Costa Rican footballer
Wardy Alfaro (born 1977), Costa Rican footballer and coach

Other people
Anastasio Alfaro (1865–1951), Costa Rican scientist and explorer
Rosie Alfaro (born 1971), American convicted murderer

See also
Alfaro (disambiguation)